Stettinius may refer to:

Stettinius (surname)
Stettinius v. United States
Taft Stettinius & Hollister